Puan may refer to:

Puan, Buenos Aires, town in Buenos Aires Province, Argentina
Puan Partido, partido in Buenos Aires Province, Argentina
Puan (Buenos Aires Metro), a metro station in Buenos Aires, Argentina
Pu'an County, in Guizhou, China
Puan Chan Cheong, businessman
Puan Maharani, Indonesian politician daughter of Megawati Soekarnoputri
Puan, Toh Puan, Malay title
Puan (spider), genus of goblin spiders from Argentina